Hyposmocoma semiusta is a species of moth of the family Cosmopterigidae. It was first described by Lord Walsingham in 1907. It is endemic to the Hawaiian islands of Oahu and Kauai.

The larvae feed on the rotten wood of Acacia koa

External links

semiusta
Endemic moths of Hawaii
Moths described in 1907
Taxa named by Thomas de Grey, 6th Baron Walsingham